James Vaughan (born 6 December 1986) is an English footballer who plays as a right-back. He has also played at left-back.

Career
Born in Liverpool, Vaughan was signed by Chester in January 2006 from Tranmere Rovers, where he made more than 50 reserve team appearances. He joined his father Stephen Vaughan, Sr. (owner) and his brother, Stephen Vaughan at the club. His first-team debut came when he replaced his brother in the closing stages of Chester's 4–4 draw in the EFL Trophy at Chesterfield on 29 November 2006.

After a successful loan spell at Droylsden, who he helped win the Conference North title, Vaughan returned to Chester and was a regular in the closing matches of the 2006–07.

Vaughan was given squad number 22 for 2007–08 and commanded a regular spot as first-choice right back for the next two seasons the English Football League. In April 2009, Vaughan moved to Australia and joined Wollongong for who he played seven games. Whilst in Australia he played a further two games with A-League side Sydney FC, and one game for A-League side Central Coast Mariners. Despite looking promising at the back, he was not offered a contract due to visa restrictions. Upon his return to the UK, he has been linked with a move to League One side Oldham Athletic.

On 24 October, Vaughan dropped into non league football signing a 2-year contract at Droylsden FC.

References

External links

1986 births
Footballers from Liverpool
Living people
English footballers
Association football fullbacks
Tranmere Rovers F.C. players
Chester City F.C. players
Droylsden F.C. players
English Football League players
Expatriate soccer players in Australia
Wollongong Wolves FC players